This is a list of current and former Roman Catholic churches in the Roman Catholic Diocese of Wilmington. The diocese covers the entire state of Delaware and the Eastern Shore of Maryland. The cathedral church of the diocese is the Cathedral of St. Peter in Wilmington, Delaware.

Delaware

Wilmington

New Castle County (other than Wilmington)

Kent and Sussex Counties

Eastern Shore of Maryland

References

 
Wilmington